Don Hume (born May 8, 1938) is a former NASCAR driver from Belvidere, New Jersey. In his limited NASCAR career, Hume competed in fifteen Winston Cup events.

Winston Cup

1964

Hume appeared in the series in 1964, completing two races late in the year. In his debut at Darlington, Hume started 28th but slid to 38th after an early crash. Hume would then barely improve at Charlotte, where he finished 35th due to overheating.

1965

Hume had a significantly better season in 1965, when he competed in four events. He only managed to finish one of the four races. That race,  at Charlotte, Hume finished 18th. All of his DNFs were due to mechanical issues.

1981

Hume returned to the series after a sixteen-year absence in 1981, completing one race for D.K. Ulrich. He started the race at Rockingham in 33rd position and would finish there after an early race crash. During his absence, he served on the Olympia, Washington police force. Although already a felon, the lack of computerization at the time allowed him to be hired. A known wife-beater and considered by fellow officers to be a dishonest cop, he was suspected in the 1970 slaying of 17-year-old student Patricia Kathleen Garrison. He was let go from the OPD. The Garrison homicide remains open.

1984

Another multiple year absence ended in 1984, when Hume ran a race for Bahari Racing. After starting 23rd at Atlanta, Hume came home with a 26th-place finish. He would finish that event twenty-nine laps down.

1985

Hume ended his career with a seven-race stretch in 1985. It was a decent season, driving for James Hylton. In his seven starts, he once again struggled to finish races, only completing four of those. However, all four ended up being top-21 finishes. The best of the year, and his career, was a 16th-place effort at Bristol. After a 38th place showing in points, Hume was replaced and he has not driven in NASCAR since.

External links

Sportspeople from Warren County, New Jersey
NASCAR drivers
Living people
1938 births
Racing drivers from New Jersey
People from Belvidere, New Jersey